Carmarthen by-elections are the by-elections held on occasion for the British House of Commons constituency of Carmarthen in North Wales:

 1878 Carmarthen Boroughs by-election
 1882 Carmarthen Boroughs by-election
 1924 Carmarthen by-election
 1928 Carmarthen by-election
 1941 Carmarthen by-election
 1957 Carmarthen by-election
 1966 Carmarthen by-election

See also 
 Carmarthen (UK Parliament constituency)
 List of United Kingdom by-elections